"Harlem Shuffle" is an R&B song written and originally recorded by the duo Bob & Earl in 1963.

Harlem Shuffle may also refer to:

 Harlem Shuffle (dance step)
 Harlem Shuffle EP, 2008 EP by 40 Cal.
 Harlem Shuffle (novel), 2021 novel by Colson Whitehead

See also
 Harlem shake (disambiguation)